Albert Gossage Robinson (born Wellingborough, 12 November 1863; died Salisbury - 13 September 1948) was an Anglican  priest, most notably Archdeacon of Surrey from 1908 to 1922.

Robinson was educated at Lord Williams's School, Thame and Christ's College, Cambridge. He was ordained in 1889. 
 After curacies in Darlington, Rownhams and Meole Brace he held incumbencies at Toft, Busbridge and Ryde.

References

1948 deaths
1863 births
People from Wellingborough
People educated at Lord Williams's School
Alumni of Christ's College, Cambridge
Archdeacons of Surrey